Ingvill Måkestad Bovim (born 7 August 1981, in Odda) is a Norwegian track and field athlete who specializes in middle distance running. She is the Norwegian record holder over 800 metres (1:59.82 minutes) and the less-contested 1000 m run (2:36.7 minutes). Her personal best in the 1500 metres is 4:02.20 minutes.

She represented Norway over 1500 m at the 2010 European Athletics Championships and 2011 European Athletics Indoor Championships but did not progress beyond the heats. She won the 1500 metres in the First League section of the 2011 European Team Championships and went on to finish sixth in the event at the 2011 World Championships in Athletics

Achievements

References

1981 births
Living people
Norwegian female middle-distance runners
People from Odda
Sportspeople from Vestland